Srednje Bitnje is a village south of Kranj in the Upper Carniola region of Slovenia.

The local church, built in a field outside the village, is dedicated to Saint Ursula.

References

External links

Srednje Bitnje on Geopedia

Populated places in the City Municipality of Kranj